The 2007 Fusagasugá City Council election was held on Sunday, 28 October 2007, to elect the second City Council since the 2002 reform (Legislative Act 2002). At stake were all 17 seats in the City Council.

Results

References 

Regional elections
2007